Men at Large is an American R&B group. They were discovered by soul singer Gerald Levert.

Discography

Albums

Singles

References

Musical groups from Cleveland
Musical groups established in 1992
American contemporary R&B musical groups
New jack swing music groups
East West Records artists